Bangladesh Institute of Child Health is a medical school and research institute in Bangladesh.

History
Bangladesh Institute of Child Health was established in 1983. It is the academic wing of the Dhaka Shishu Hospital and if affiliated with Dhaka University. It offers a number of graduate degrees such as Doctor of Medicine, Diploma in Child Health, Fellow of the College of Physicians and Surgeons, and Master of Surgery. It is also affiliated with Bangladesh College of Physicians and Surgeons and Bangabandhu Sheikh Mujib Medical University. It also has research ties with the UCL Great Ormond Street Institute of Child Health and Johns Hopkins University. In 2020, the Cabinet of Bangladesh approved a draft law to merge Dhaka Shishu Hospital and Bangladesh Institute of Child Health called Bangladesh Shishu Hospital and Institute Bill.

References

Maternity in Bangladesh
Pediatric organizations
Organizations established in 1983
Medical research institutes in Bangladesh
1983 establishments in Bangladesh
Organisations based in Dhaka
Research institutes in Bangladesh